Al-Dair Sport Club is an Iraqi football team based in Al-Dair District, Basra, that plays in Iraq Division Three.

Managerial history

  Mohammed Al-Qaisi
  Bassim Karim 
  Aqeel Muslim

See also 
 2000–01 Iraqi Elite League
 2021–22 Iraq FA Cup

References

External links
 Al-Dair SC on Goalzz.com
 Iraq Clubs- Foundation Dates

Football clubs in Iraq
1994 establishments in Iraq
Association football clubs established in 1994
Football clubs in Basra
Basra